The Tower Life Building (formerly the Smith-Young Tower and the Transit Tower) is a 31-story building and a historical 
landmark in Downtown San Antonio, Texas, USA. As of 2023, the Tower Life Building is the 4th tallest building in San Antonio and the tallest eight-sided structure in the United States. 

The building opened in 1929 and was originally named the Smith-Young Tower and is the central component of a partially completed development called the Bowen Island Skyscrapers. The eight sided, neo-gothic brick and Ludowici green terra-cotta tower (complete with gargoyles) was designed by noted local architectural firm Ayres & Ayres (Atlee & Robert M. Ayres). While the exterior uses traditional materials such as brick, the internal structure is reinforced concrete on the lower floors, and steel frame on the upper floors. The building also housed San Antonio's first Sears, Roebuck and Company store in its lowest 6 levels.

The other completed building in the development is the former Plaza Hotel (also designed by Ayres & Ayres), which opened in 1927. The property became the local outlet of Hilton Hotels in 1956 and was converted into the Granada Apartments in 1966. Subsequent structures in the development were never built as a direct result of the Stock Market Crash of 1929 and the Great Depression.

In the 1940s the building was renamed the Transit Tower for the San Antonio Transit Company, which the Smith Brothers purchased in 1943. In 1953 a television transmission tower was added to the structure.

The building is now named for its current owner, Tower Life Insurance Company.

In 1991 the building was placed on the National Register of Historic Places.

See also
Tower of the Americas
Menger Hotel
Emily D. West
Late Gothic Revival Architecture

References

Bibliography
 
 

National Register of Historic Places in San Antonio
Skyscraper office buildings in San Antonio
Office buildings on the National Register of Historic Places in Texas
Office buildings completed in 1929